Santa Cruz de la Salceda is a municipality and town in the province of Burgos, Castile and León, Spain. According to the 2004 census (INE), the municipality had a population of 178 inhabitants.

References

External links
Museo de los Aromas - The first Smell Museum in Spain

Municipalities in the Province of Burgos